Heron Island is a sandbar located in the Potomac River east-north-east of Saint Clement's Island in St. Mary's County, Maryland.  The closest town is Colton's Point, Maryland, 1/2 mile to the north.  The island is named for the large numbers of herons seen by the European colonists when they arrived in 1634.

Landforms of St. Mary's County, Maryland
Maryland
Uninhabited islands of Maryland
River islands of Maryland
Shoals of the United States